David Kelly (born 28 January 1959) is an Australian cricketer. He played in nineteen first-class and four List A matches for South Australia between 1984 and 1987.

See also
 List of South Australian representative cricketers

References

External links
 

1959 births
Living people
Australian cricketers
South Australia cricketers
Cricketers from Adelaide